The Slave Trade Act 1843 (6 & 7 Vict c 98) was an Act of the Parliament of the United Kingdom "for the more effectual Suppression of the Slave Trade."

See also 
 Slave Trade Acts
 Slave Trade Act 1807
 Slave Trade Act 1824 
 Slavery Abolition Act 1833
 Slave Trade Act 1873

References

External links 
 Text of the Slave Trade Act 1843
 Commentary on the Slave Trade Act 1843 by the Anti-Slavery Society

Abolitionism in the United Kingdom
United Kingdom Acts of Parliament 1843
Slave trade legislation